Olof Hindrik "Olle" Larsson (21 June 1928 – 13 January 1960) was a Swedish rower who competed in the 1956 Summer Olympics. He won a silver medal in the coxed fours and finished fourth in the eights competition. He won two silver medals in these events at the 1955 European Championships.

Larsson was killed in an accident on a tugboat in Trollhättan. Since then a trophy in his honor is given to the national champions in the coxed fours.

References

1928 births
1960 deaths
Swedish male rowers
Olympic rowers of Sweden
Rowers at the 1956 Summer Olympics
Olympic silver medalists for Sweden
Olympic medalists in rowing
Medalists at the 1956 Summer Olympics
European Rowing Championships medalists
People from Mariestad Municipality
Sportspeople from Västra Götaland County